Salon may refer to:

Common meanings 
 Beauty salon, a venue for cosmetic treatments
 French term for a drawing room, an architectural space in a home
 Salon (gathering), a meeting for learning or enjoyment

Arts and entertainment 
 Salon (Paris), a prestigious annual juried art exhibition in Paris begun under Louis XIV
 The Salon (TV series), a British reality television show
 The Salon (film), a 2005 American dramatic comedy movie
 The Salon (comics), a graphic novel written and illustrated by Nick Bertozzi

Places 
 Salon, Aube, France, a commune
 Salon, Dordogne, France, a commune
 Salon, India, a town and nagar panchayat
 Salon (Assembly constituency), India, a constituency for the Uttar Pradesh Legislative Assembly

Other uses
 Salon.com, an online magazine
 Champagne Salon, a producer of sparkling wine
 Salon Basnet (born 1991), Nepali actor and model

See also 
 
 Salon-de-Provence, France, a commune
 Salon-la-Tour, France, a commune
 Salon des Refusés, an art exhibition showing controversial new styles, held occasionally 1863 to 1886
 Salon des Indépendants, a non-juried alternative art salon first held in 1884
 Salon d'Automne, an alternative salon including a broader variety of arts, begun in 1903
 Saloon (disambiguation)